Tickley is a small hamlet in the large civil parish of Bentworth in Hampshire, England.

The nearest town is Alton, which lies about 4.2 miles (6.9 km) to the south-east. Its nearest railway station was formerly the Bentworth and Lasham railway station on the Basingstoke and Alton Light Railway, until its closure in 1932. The nearest railway station is now 3.6 miles (5.8 km) east of the village, at Alton.

References

Villages in Hampshire